This is a list of records of the UCI ProTour cycling competition. Bold entries indicate the record-holder is still a professional cyclist. Updated at the end of 2007 UCI ProTour.

Most

Most UCI ProTour Championships

Most UCI ProTour points (career)

Most UCI ProTour points (single season)

Most UCI ProTour victories

Most UCI ProTour victories in one season

Youngest and oldest

Oldest UCI ProTour Champion

Youngest UCI ProTour Champion

Oldest winner of a UCI ProTour race

Youngest winner of a UCI ProTour race

Oldest winner of a UCI ProTour stage

Youngest winner of a UCI ProTour stage

 In the list of youngest and oldest winners, only first or last victory is shown.

Most wins

Most Wins in UCI ProTour races

Most wins in a UCI ProTour race

Most wins in UCI ProTour races (teams)

Most stage wins in UCI ProTour races (teams)

 All 22 teams which have been part of UCI ProTour have won at least one stage. Additionally 13 wildcard teams have won the stage. This includes AG2R Prévoyance and Unibet.com, which won the stage as a wildcard, and have later on granted UCI ProTour license.
 Note: Some teams may have changed name since the start of UCI ProTour

UCI ProTour
Cycling records and statistics